Faqih Beyglu (also Romanized as Faqīh Beyglū) is a village in Baranduzchay-ye Shomali Rural District, in the Central District of Urmia County, West Azerbaijan Province, Iran. At the 2006 census, its population was 391, in 99 families.

References 

Populated places in Urmia County